Augustin de Macarty (sometimes anglicized, as McCarty or McCarthy) was a mayor of New Orleans from September 7, 1815, to May 1, 1820. He was a member of an influential Creole family allied by marriage to Esteban Rodríguez Miró, one of the last Spanish Governors of Louisiana. He was brought to the mayoralty by the resignation of the previous mayor, Nicolas Girod, but subsequently served two full terms, to which he was elected by landslide majorities; after which he declined further terms.

His tenure was chiefly marked by the first officially recorded outbreak of yellow fever, and the subsequent creation of the city's first Board of Health in 1817. It initiated systematic garbage removal and the institution of a port quarantine. In 1816, a comprehensive ordinance regulated theaters. In 1817, house numbering was instituted. In 1818, the city limits were expanded to include what is now the Eighth Ward. In 1819, the city's first public waterworks system was begun; its execution was entrusted to Benjamin Henry Latrobe, who succumbed to yellow fever there himself, the following year.

During Macarty's tenure, the population of New Orleans grew from 33,000 to 41,000; and commerce, measured by Mississippi boat traffic and receipts, doubled. The expansion of New Orleans into the "American Quarter" took place under Macarty's tenure and that of the next mayor, Roffignac.

Macarty was a cousin of Delphine LaLaurie, née Macarty, alleged to be a killer of slaves and a serial killer.

External links
Macarty and Roffignac (Kendall's History of New Orleans, Chapter 7)

Mayors of New Orleans
1774 births
1844 deaths
Louisiana Creole people
People in 19th-century Louisiana
Macarty family